Periwinkle is a 1917 American silent film directed by James Kirkwood and starring Mary Miles Minter. It was based on the 1910 novel Periwinkle; an Idyl of the Dunes written by William Farquhar Payson. As with many of Minter's features, it is thought to be a lost film.

Plot

As described in various film magazine reviews, Periwinkle (Minter) was rescued from a shipwreck as a baby by the members of a remote coast-guard station. She is raised by Ann Scudder (Schaefer) and her elderly father Ephraim (Periolat), and cared for by all of the men at the coastguard station. When she grows older, she helps them when there are shipwrecks.

One night, Periwinkle helps to rescue Dick Langdon (Fisher), a wealthy and carefree New York socialite, from the wreck of his yacht. She nurses him back to health at the coast-guard station, where they fall in love. Langdon, however, is engaged to another, and Periwinkle is heartbroken when he recovers and is due to leave.

Meanwhile, realising that her adopted daughter loves Langdon, Ann Scudder finds the address of Langdon's fiancée and writes to her. Ann receives a telegram in reply, informing her that, in Langdon's absence, his fiancée has married another. She rushes to tell Langdon and Periwinkle and, with the approval of the men of the coast-guard station, the two are free to wed.

Cast
 Mary Miles Minter - Periwinkle
 George Fisher - Richard Langdon Evans
 Arthur Howard - Jim Curran
 Clarence Burton - Sam Coffin
 Allan Forrest - Ira
 Harvey Clark - Captain Sears
 George Periolat - Ephraim Rawlins
 Anne Schaefer - Ann Scudder
 George Ahearn - Mortimer Hale

References

External links

1917 films
American silent feature films
American black-and-white films
1917 drama films
Silent American drama films
Lost American films
1917 lost films
Lost drama films
Films directed by James Kirkwood Sr.
1910s American films